Robert Claus Johan Fux (born May 15, 1979 in Kalmar, Sweden) is a Swedish actor, performance artist, playwright and drag queen.

Early life and education
Robert Fux grew up outside of Kalmar and in Vienna, Austria along with six siblings. He is an alumnus of the Stockholm Academy of Dramatic Arts.

Theatre

Roles (non-exhaustive)

TV

On September 6 2022 it was announced that was he had been cast as the host of Drag Race Sverige

Awards and accolades
 2007 — Barometern OT's stora kulturpris
 2008 — Rebells artistpris
 2014 — Medeapriset

Sources

1979 births
Living people
Swedish actors
Swedish artists
Swedish dramatists and playwrights
Swedish drag queens
Drag Race Sverige